NWSS may refer to:

New Westminster Secondary School
Native Woodland Survey of Scotland
National Water Services Strategy, part of the Kenyan government's strategy for water supply and sanitation in Kenya
North West Surrey Synagogue
Nuclear War Survival Skills, a civil defense manual in the United States
 Navy WWMCCS Standard Software